Esther Freud (born 2 May 1963) is a British novelist.

Early life and training
Born in London, Freud is the daughter of Bernardine Coverley and painter Lucian Freud. She is also a great-granddaughter of Sigmund Freud and niece of Clement Freud. She travelled extensively with her mother as a child, returning to London at 16 to train as an actress at The Drama Centre.

Career
She has worked in television and theatre as both actress and writer. Her first credited television appearance was as a terrified diner in The Bill in 1984, running frantically out of a Chinese restaurant after it had received a bomb scare. A year later she appeared as an alien in the Doctor Who serial Attack of the Cybermen.  Her novels include the semi-autobiographical Hideous Kinky, which was adapted into a film starring Kate Winslet.

She is also the author of The Wild, Gaglow, and The Sea House. She also wrote the foreword for The Summer Book by Tove Jansson.

Freud was named as one of the 20 "Best of Young British Novelists" by Granta magazine in 1993. Her novels have been translated into 13 languages. She is also the co-founder (with Kitty Aldridge) of the women's theatre company Norfolk Broads.

In 2009, she donated the short story Rice Cakes and Starbucks to Oxfam's 'Ox-Tales' project, four collections of UK stories written by 38 authors. Her story was published in the 'Water' collection.  As of 2014 Freud taught at the Faber Academy.

Personal life
Freud has a sister, fashion designer Bella Freud, and a half-brother, Noah Woodman. Her uncle was politician Sir Clement Freud. She has two cousins in the media industry; public relations executive Matthew and broadcaster Emma.

She was married to actor David Morrissey, with whom she had three children. They married in 2006. They had separated by 2020, when Freud began living with a boyfriend. Freud maintains homes in London and Walberswick near Southwold in Suffolk.

Freud's maternal grandparents were practising Irish Catholics but her mother was non-observant, while her father's Jewish family were atheists. She identifies herself as Jewish.

Bibliography

Novels 
 Hideous Kinky (1992)
 Peerless Flats (1993)
 Gaglow (1997)
 The Wild (2000)
 The Sea House (2003)
 Love Falls (2007)
 Lucky Break (2010)
 Mr Mac and Me (2014)
 I Couldn't Love You More (2021)

Short fiction 

Stories

Critical studies and reviews of Freud's work
I couldn't love you more

See also
 Freud family

References

External links
 
 

1963 births
Living people
20th-century British women writers
20th-century English novelists
21st-century British women writers
21st-century English novelists
Actresses from London
British people of German-Jewish descent
British women novelists
English Jews
English people of Irish descent
Esther
Jewish Austrian writers
The New Yorker people
Writers from London